La Red (Spanish for "The Network" or "The Net") may refer to:

 Rossana (film), known in Spanish as La red, a 1953 Mexican drama directed by Emilio Fernández
 La Red (Chilean TV channel), a private television channel in Chile
 , a television channel in Uruguay
 , a Colombian variety show on air since 2011

See also
 Red (disambiguation)
 The Net (disambiguation)